Lucy Julia Barns Scarvell (23 January 1904 -  17 February 1985) was a New Zealand artist.

Biography 
Scarvell was born in 1904 in Christchurch, the daughter of John Larking Scarvell (eldest son of Henry Ramsay Scarvell) and Lucy Mary Scarvell (née Malthus, eldest daughter of Charles E.D. Malthus). Scarvell socialised with artist Olivia Spencer Bower during her youth.

Scarvell studied towards a Diploma of Fine Arts at the Canterbury College School of Art, graduating in May 1933. After Scarvell's family fell on tough times, her and her sister Mary were forced to work. Scarvell taught at the Canterbury College School of Art, under the direction of Florence Atkins who observed that Scarvell was a quiet person more inclined to embroidery than other handcrafts. After teaching at the School, Scarvell then took up an appointment as art mistress at St Margaret's College in Christchurch, in 1934, and then later taught at Christchurch Girls' High School.

In May 1936 Scarvell and two painter friends, Rita Angus and Louise Henderson, travelled by train to the small high country community of Cass, 120 km north-west of Christchurch. They stayed there for ten days at the Mountain Biological Station owned by Canterbury University College, painting and sketching the surrounding countryside.

During the 1940s and 1950s Scarvell was active in the Canterbury Housewives' Union, a group dominated by May Furey.

Scarvell died on 17 February 1985, and she is buried in Waimairi Cemetery, Christchurch with her father and mother.

References 

1904 births
1985 deaths
People from Christchurch
Ilam School of Fine Arts alumni